Lac Brûlé (English: Burnt Lake) is a body of fresh water located northeast of the city of Quebec, in the unorganized territory of Lac-Jacques-Cartier, in the La Côte-de-Beaupré Regional County Municipality, in the administrative region of Capitale-Nationale, in the province, in Quebec, in Canada.

Lac Brûlé is served by a few secondary forest roads for forestry purposes. Forestry is the main economic activity in this valley; recreational tourism, second.

Because of the altitude, the surface of Lac Brûlé is generally frozen from the end of November until the beginning of April; however, safe circulation on the ice is generally done from the beginning of December until the beginning of April.

Geography 
Lac Brûlé which is set between the mountains. Its mouth is located at:
  west of the northwest shore of the St. Lawrence River;
  west of the summit of Mont Raoul-Blanchard;
  north-west of the confluence of the Sainte-Anne and Brûlé rivers;
  southwest of downtown Baie-Saint-Paul.

This misshapen body of water looks like a mushroom, the stem of which leans west. Lac Savane is mainly supplied by the outlet of Lac des Vases, an unidentified stream and the outlet of Lac à Chiens. Lac Brûlé is a body of water artificially enhanced by the construction of a dam at its mouth.

Toponymy 
Probably born around 1592 in Champigny-sur-Marne in France, Étienne Brûlé became an explorer and an interpreter in the Wendat (Huron) language. He arrived in the colony at the same time as Samuel de Champlain, with whom he enlisted in 1608. Brûlé was possibly the first European to have entered Huronia. He explored several territories including Georgian Bay and Lakes Huron, Ontario, Superior and Erie, where he traded furs for the French. During the illegal capture of Quebec by the Kirke brothers in 1629, in a context of war between England and France, Étienne Brulé went to the service of the English. Finally, the Treaty of Saint-Germain-en-Laye put an end to the conflict by restoring New France to France, in 1632. Samuel de Champlain returned to the colony and accuses Étienne Brûlé of treason in these terms: "Here are those who betrayed their Roy & sold their homeland […]". Étienne Brulé then took refuge in Huronia where he was killed, in the year 1633.

The toponym "Lac Savane" was formalized on March 25, 1997, at the Place Names Bank of the Commission de toponymie du Québec.

References

See also

Related article 
 La Côte-de-Beaupré Regional County Municipality
 Lac-Jacques-Cartier, an unorganized territory
 Brûlé River (Sainte-Anne River tributary)
 Sainte-Anne River (Beaupré)
 St. Lawrence River

External links 

Lakes of Capitale-Nationale
La Côte-de-Beaupré Regional County Municipality